Musone is a surname. Notable people with the surname include:

Angelo Musone (born 1963), Italian boxer